Lakterashan or Lak Tarashan may refer to:
 Lak Tarashan, Neka
 Lakterashan, Tonekabon